The first season of the Japanese animated television series A Certain Magical Index, which is based on the light novel of the same name, follows the first meeting of Toma Kamijo, a high school student in the scientific-advanced Academy City whose right hand contains a unique power, and Index, a young nun from the Church of England whose mind has been implanted with 103,000 grimoires of the Index Librorum Prohibitorum. It was produced by J.C.Staff, with Hiroshi Nishikiori and Masanao Akahoshi serving as director and series composition writer, respectively. 

Atsushi Abe, Yuka Iguchi, Rina Satō, and Satomi Arai reprise their audio drama roles and are joined by cast members Shizuka Itō, Kishō Taniyama, Anri Katsu, Kimiko Koyama, and Nobuhiko Okamoto. An anime television adaptation of Kazuma Kamachi's light novel was confirmed in June 2008 and adapts its first six volumes.

A Certain Magical Index aired in Japan from October 4, 2008, to March 19, 2009, and consists of 24 episodes. A second season was announced in June 2010.


Episode list

Cast and characters

Main

Recurring

Production

Development and writing
In June 2008, an anime television adaptation of Kazuma Kamachi's A Certain Magical Index was confirmed through a promotional sleeve wrapper of the light novel's 16th volume. J.C.Staff was announced to be producing the series, while Hiroshi Nishikiori, who previously worked on Angelic Layer: Mobile Angel, Masanao Akahoshi, who wrote several episodes of Sky Girls, and Yuichi Tanaka were confirmed as director, series composition writer, and character animation designer, respectively. Kazuma Miki, the light novel editor, wanted to make changes during the process of adapting the light novel into anime but felt a "double-edged sword" when thinking how to bring "Kamachi's color" to it and what fans would find interesting. Nishikiori laid out the concept of "following the original story" instead and aimed to have the viewers say so as well. The series adapted the first to the sixth volume of the light novel.

Casting
Atsushi Abe, Yuka Iguchi, Rina Satō, and Satomi Arai reprise their respective roles from the drama CD of the series, which was released in 2007, as Toma Kamijo, Index, Mikoto Misaka, and Kuroko Shirai. The main cast also includes Shizuka Itō as Kaori Kanzaki, Kishō Taniyama as Stiyl Magnus, Anri Katsu as Motoharu Tsuchimikado, Kimiko Koyama as Komoe Tsukuyomi, and Nobuhiko Okamoto as Accelerator.

On August 25, 2012, Funimation announced the English dub cast for the series. These include Micah Solusod as Kamijo, Monica Rial as Index, Brittney Karbowski as Misaka, Alison Viktorin as Shirai, Morgan Garrett as Kanzaki, Robert McCollum as Magnus, Newton Pittman as Tsuchimikado, Jad Saxton as Tsukuyomi, and Austin Tindle as Accelerator.

Music
I've Sound was selected to compose the music for the series due to Nishikiori's desire to have a "trance-like" soundtrack. Mami Kawada performed the first opening theme music, which was used from episodes 1 to 16 (the DVD release updated the final use of it to episode 14), titled "PSI-Missing" and the second one, which was used from episode 17 (episode 15 in the DVD release) onwards, titled "Masterpiece". Iku performed the first ending theme music titled  and the second one, which was used from episode 20 onwards, titled .

Marketing
In July 2008, Geneon Entertainment released a promotional video for the upcoming release of the series. In August 2008, Iguchi hosted a talk show event alongside Eri Kitamura, who voiced Ami Kawashima from Toradora!, at the 74th Comiket in Odaiba to promote their series. In October, the staff and cast of the series were present during a stage event at Dengeki Bunko Autumn Festival 2008 in Akihabara.

Release

Broadcast
A Certain Magical Index began airing in Japan on Chiba TV, tvk, and MBS on October 4, 2008, on Teletama on October 6, on CBC on October 8, and on AT-X on October 9. The series began broadcasting in North America on the Funimation Channel on January 21, 2013.

Home media

Geneon Entertainment released eight Blu-ray and DVD volumes of A Certain Magical Index in Japan starting January 23, 2009. Each volume contains a  bonus novel written by Kamachi titled A Certain Scientific Railgun SS: Liberal Arts City, while the first and fifth volumes are bundled with episodes 1 and 2 of the bonus anime A Certain Magical Index-tan. The first DVD set containing the first twelve episodes of the season was released on December 17, 2010, while the second DVD set containing the remaining episodes was released on March 9, 2011.

Funimation began streaming the series in North America in September 2012. They later released two DVD volumes on December 18, 2012, after getting delayed from its original October 30 release, while a Blu-ray and DVD combo set was released on November 18, 2014. Universal Sony Pictures Home Entertainment released two DVD volumes in Australia on April 24, 2013. Hulu released the series in Japan on March 24, 2022. Muse Asia began streaming the series on their official YouTube channel on April 19, 2022.

Reception

Critical response
Ian Wolf of Anime UK News scored A Certain Magical Index 7 out of 10, praising the action scenes, voice acting, and animation quality while calling the music "OK". Carlo Santos of Anime News Network graded the season 'C+', feeling that the "fight scenes, mind-bending story ideas, and unlikely plot twists" would delight fans but criticizing the "long-winded dialogue" and arrangement of story arcs that left "no sense of progression over the season". Nicoletta Christina Browne of THEM Anime Reviews was critical of the show's characters, describing Toma Kamijo a "boring and ineffective lead", the bond between him and Index "staler and shallower" than Toradora! characters Ryuji Takasu and Taiga Aisaka, and Mikoto Misaka a "poorly-written character", unlike her appearance in A Certain Scientific Railgun series. She rated the season 2 out of 5 stars, stating that it "isn't a total loss, but... was a bit of a tedious series".

Accolade
Abe won Best Rookie at the 4th Seiyu Awards for his role as Toma Kamijo.

Note

References

External links
 Official website 
 

2008 anime television series debuts
A Certain Magical Index
A Certain Magical Index episode lists
J.C.Staff
Television episodes about cloning